Izard County Consolidated School District (ICCSD) is a public school district based in Brockwell, Arkansas, United States. ICCSD supports more than 500 students with more than 110 faculty and staff at its three schools.

The school district encompasses  of land, including portions of Izard County and serving communities such as Franklin, almost all of Horseshoe Bend, Oxford, Violet Hill, Brockwell, Wiseman, and Ash Flat.

The district proves comprehensive education for pre-kindergarten through grade 12 and is accredited by the Arkansas Department of Education (ADE) and by AdvancED.

History 
The Oxford School District and the Violet Hill School District consolidated into Izard County Consolidated on July 1, 1985.

Schools 
 Izard County Consolidated High School, located in Brockwell and serving more than 150 students in grades 9 through 12.
 Izard County Consolidated Middle School, located in Brockwell and serving more than 150 students in grades 5 through 8.
 Izard County Consolidated Elementary School, located in Violet Hill and serving more than 200 students in pre-kindergarten through grade 4.

References

Further reading
These include maps of predecessor districts:
 (Download)

External links 
 

School districts in Arkansas
Education in Izard County, Arkansas
1985 establishments in Arkansas
School districts established in 1985